Henny Penny is an American manufacturer of commercial grade food equipment based in Eaton, Ohio.  The company was founded in 1957 and employs over 500 people.  Notable clients include KFC, Wendy's, McDonald's, Chick-fil-A and Chicken Licken. The company became employee-owned in 2015.

Products

Evolution Elite Open Fryer
In 2009, Henny Penny introduced a reduced-oil capacity technology with the Evolution Elite Open Fryer, a deep fat fryer using 30 lbs. of frying oil in the vat instead of the previous 50 lbs.

Awards
Henny Penny has received several awards from industry associations and customers.

KFC
 KFC 2010 U.S. Equipment Supplier of the Year
 KFC 2011 U.S. Equipment Supplier of the Year
 KFC 2011 U.S. Supplier of the Year
 KFC 2012 U.S. Equipment Supplier of the Year

McDonald's
 McDonald's 2008 Innovation Award
 McDonald's 2009 Global Equipment Supplier of the Year
 McDonald's 2010 Global Equipment Partner of the Year

References

External links
 Henny Penny Website

Manufacturing companies based in Ohio